Wydundra is a genus of ground spiders that was first described by Norman I. Platnick & Barbara Baehr in 2006. Originally placed with the long-spinneret ground spiders, it was transferred to the ground spiders in 2018.

Species
 it contains forty-six species, found only in Australia and Malaysia:
Wydundra alexandria Platnick & Baehr, 2013 – Australia (Northern Territory)
Wydundra anjo Platnick & Baehr, 2006 – Australia (Western Australia)
Wydundra barrow Platnick & Baehr, 2006 – Australia (Western Australia, Northern Territory)
Wydundra camooweal Platnick & Baehr, 2013 – Australia (Queensland)
Wydundra carinda Platnick & Baehr, 2006 – Australia (South Australia, New South Wales)
Wydundra charnley Platnick & Baehr, 2006 – Australia (Western Australia)
Wydundra chillagoe Platnick & Baehr, 2013 – Australia (Queensland)
Wydundra churchillae Platnick & Baehr, 2006 – Australia (Northern Territory)
Wydundra clifton Platnick & Baehr, 2006 – Australia (South Australia)
Wydundra cooper Platnick & Baehr, 2006 – Australia (South Australia, New South Wales)
Wydundra cunderdin Platnick & Baehr, 2006 – Australia (Western Australia)
Wydundra daunton Platnick & Baehr, 2006 – Australia (Queensland)
Wydundra drysdale Platnick & Baehr, 2006 – Australia (Western Australia)
Wydundra ethabuka Platnick & Baehr, 2006 – Australia (Northern Territory, Queensland)
Wydundra fitzroy Platnick & Baehr, 2006 – Australia (Queensland)
Wydundra flattery Platnick & Baehr, 2006 – Australia (Queensland)
Wydundra garnet Platnick & Baehr, 2006 – Australia (Queensland)
Wydundra gibb Platnick & Baehr, 2006 – Australia (Western Australia, Northern Territory)
Wydundra gilliat Platnick & Baehr, 2013 – Australia (Queensland)
Wydundra gully Platnick & Baehr, 2006 – Australia (Queensland)
Wydundra gunbiyarrmi Platnick & Baehr, 2006 – Australia (Northern Territory)
Wydundra humbert Platnick & Baehr, 2006 – Australia (Northern Territory)
Wydundra humptydoo Platnick & Baehr, 2006 – Australia (Northern Territory)
Wydundra jabiru Platnick & Baehr, 2006 – Australia (Northern Territory)
Wydundra kalamurina Platnick & Baehr, 2006 – Australia (South Australia)
Wydundra kennedy Platnick & Baehr, 2006 – Australia (Western Australia)
Wydundra kohi Platnick & Baehr, 2006 – Australia (Queensland)
Wydundra leichhardti Platnick & Baehr, 2013 – Australia (Queensland)
Wydundra lennard Platnick & Baehr, 2006 – Australia (Western Australia)
Wydundra lindsay Platnick & Baehr, 2006 – Australia (South Australia)
Wydundra lowrie Platnick & Baehr, 2006 – Australia (Queensland)
Wydundra moolooloo Platnick & Baehr, 2006 – Australia (South Australia)
Wydundra moondarra Platnick & Baehr, 2006 – Australia (Queensland)
Wydundra morton Platnick & Baehr, 2006 – Australia (New South Wales)
Wydundra neinaut Platnick & Baehr, 2006 – Australia (Queensland)
Wydundra newcastle Platnick & Baehr, 2006 – Australia (Queensland)
Wydundra normanton Platnick & Baehr, 2006 – Australia (Queensland)
Wydundra octomile Platnick & Baehr, 2006 – Australia (Queensland)
Wydundra osbourne Platnick & Baehr, 2006 (type) – Australia (Queensland)
Wydundra percy Platnick & Baehr, 2006 – Australia (Queensland)
Wydundra solo Platnick & Baehr, 2006 – Australia (Western Australia)
Wydundra uluru Platnick & Baehr, 2006 – Australia (Western Australia, Northern Territory)
Wydundra undara Platnick & Baehr, 2006 – Australia (Queensland)
Wydundra voc (Deeleman-Reinhold, 2001) – Malaysia, Indonesia Moluccas)
Wydundra webberae Platnick & Baehr, 2006 – Australia (Northern Territory)
Wydundra windsor Platnick & Baehr, 2006 – Australia (Queensland)

See also
 List of Gnaphosidae species

References

Araneomorphae genera
Gnaphosidae
Spiders of Australia